Xinxin Ming (alternate spellings Xin Xin Ming or Xinxinming) (Chinese: 信心銘; Pīnyīn: Xìnxīn Míng; Wade–Giles: Hsin Hsin Ming; Rōmaji: Shinjinmei), meaning "Faith in Mind", is a poem attributed to the Third Chinese Chán Patriarch Jianzhi Sengcan (Chinese: 鑑智僧璨; Pīnyīn: Jiànzhì Sēngcàn; Wade–Giles: Chien-chih Seng-ts'an; Romaji: Kanchi Sōsan) and one of the earliest Chinese Chan expressions of the Buddhist mind training practice.

Title translation 
"Xinxin" has commonly been interpreted as "faith" or "trust."  For example, one translation is "Faith in Mind" (See The Poetry of Enlightenment: Poems by Ancient Ch'an Masters, Ch'an Master Sheng-Yen).  While this interpretation may appear to some to be a departure from the traditional view of seeking refuge in the Three Jewels (Buddha, Dharma and Sangha), it is actually a deliberate declaration and poetic polemic of the Chan (Zen) school written as a response to the increasingly popular movement of faith in Amitaba Buddha known as Pure Land Buddhism.  From the Chan/Zen point of view, Buddha and Mind are one (即心即佛) (see the Platform Sutra of the Sixth Patriarch (六祖壇經)), as expressed in Mazu's famous dictum "Mind is Buddha". Thus, faith in outward Buddhas is contrary to the goal of Buddhism, which is the direct experience of enlightenment. This can only be attained by having faith in Mind as Shakyamuni Buddha himself did. Variations of the title include: "Inscription on Trust in the Mind", "Verses on the Faith Mind", and "On Believing in Mind", as well as others. John McRae (1986:316 n. 64) argues that the title should be translated as "Inscription on Relying on the Mind" or "Inscription of the Perfected Mind". The word "inscription" does accurately convey the idea of a truth that can survive the test of time and is the more literal meaning of ming (銘).

Another reading of the text allows that Xinxin could be understood as the Truthful Mind, which is always ready and perfect, implying that there is no need to further "perfect" it. Because in the Chinese language today, Xinxin (信心) usually means "trust", "confidence", or "believing mind", it is often forgotten that Xinxin can also be understood as the truthful mind (信實的心).

From the Chan/Zen view, the true mind is perfect as it is and only false views obscure the true mind's inherent perfection. As the text states,

"Any degeneration of your previous practice on emptiness arises because of false perspectives.
There is really no need to go after the Truth but there is indeed a need to extinguish biased views." (前空轉變  皆由妄見  不用求真  唯須息見)

Moreover, the passage that follows immediately after explicitly warns against losing the original, true mind (失心):

"Do not dwell in the two biased views. Make sure you do not pursue. The moment you think about right and wrong, that moment you unwittingly lose your true mind." (二見不住  慎勿追尋 才有是非  紛然失心)

Whether translated as Faith in Mind, Believing in Mind, Trust in Mind, or The Truthful Mind, the central message of the Xinxin Ming is the same: to point directly to Mind by giving up one-sided views so we can see the One Suchness of reality as it is.(心若不異  萬法一如)

Authorship 
Although Sengcan has been traditionally been attributed as the author, modern scholars believe that the verse was written well after Sengcan's death, probably during the Tang Dynasty (Chinese: 唐朝; pinyin: Tángcháo) (618 – 907). (Dumoulin, p 97) Some scholars note the similarity with a poem called Mind Inscription by Niu-t'ou Fa-jung (594-657) of the Oxhead school of Chan and have speculated that the Xinxin Ming is an abridged version of the Mind Inscription. The classical source of the Xinxin Ming can be found in the Transmission of the Lamp (Chinese: 景德傳燈錄; Pinyin: Jǐngdé Chuándēng-lù; Wade–Giles: Ching-te Ch'uanteng-lu; Japanese: Keitoku Dentō-roku).

History 
The Xinxin Ming has been much beloved by Chan (Zen) practitioners for over a thousand years. It is still studied in Western Zen circles.

As an early expression of Chan Buddhism, the Inscription on Faith in Mind reveals the Buddhist missionary use of expedient means (upaya) in China by adapting Taoist terminology to the Buddhist context of awakening. It also draws on the Wisdom sutras as well as the Avatamsaka Sutra and Lankavatara Sutra to express the essential unity of opposites and the basic nature of emptiness (śūnyatā) 

The poem professes the need to take pleasant and unpleasant life experiences with a sense of equanimity.  Broadly speaking, the Xinxin Ming deals with the principles and practice of non-duality, that is, with the application of nonduality and the results of its practice.

Excerpts

Opening verse

The opening verse, variously translated, sets out the fundamental principle:

 The best way [Great Way, the Tao] is not difficult
 It only excludes picking and choosing
 Once you stop loving and hating
 It will enlighten itself. 
 (trans. D. Pajin)

Alternatively:

 The Perfect Way knows no difficulties
 Except that it refuses to make preferences;
 Only when freed from hate and love,
 It reveals itself fully and without disguise 
 (trans. by D.T. Suzuki)

And also:

 There is nothing difficult about the Great Way,
 But avoid choosing!
 Only when you neither love nor hate,
 Does it appear in all clarity.
 (trans. R.H. Blyth, Zen and Zen Classics)

Last verse
The poem ends with:

 Emptiness here, Emptiness there,
 but the infinite universe stands always before your eyes.
 Infinitely large and infinitely small;
 no difference, for definitions have vanished
 and no boundaries are seen.
 So too with Being
 and non-Being.
 Don't waste time in doubts and arguments
 that have nothing to do with this.
 One thing, all things:
 move among and intermingle, without distinction.
 To live in this realization
 is to be without anxiety about non-perfection.
 To live in this faith is the road to non-duality,
 Because the non-dual is one with the trusting mind.
 Words! The Way is beyond language,
 for in it there is
 no yesterday
 no tomorrow
 no today. 
(trans. Richard B. Clarke)

Alternatively:

 One in All,
 All in One—
 If only this is realized,
 No more worry about your not being perfect!

Where Mind and each believing mind are not divided,
And undivided are each believing mind and Mind,
This is where words fail;
For it is not of the past, present, and future.
(trans. D.T. Suzuki)

And also:

 One thing is all things;
 All things are one thing.
 If this is so for you,
 There is no need to worry about perfect knowledge.
 The believing mind is not dual;
 What is not dual is not the believing mind.
 Beyond all language,
 For it there is no past, no present, no future.
 (trans. R.H. Blyth, Zen and Zen Classics)

Bibliography
 Blyth, R. (1960). Zen and Zen Classics, Vol. I. Hokuseido Press .
 Clarke, Richard (1973, 1984). Hsin Hsin Ming: Verses on the Faith-Mind. Buffalo, New York: White Pine Press. 
 
 Dumoulin, Heinrich (1994, 1998). Zen Buddhism: A History, Volume I, India and China, Simon & Schuster and Prentice Hall International 
 McRae, John R (1986). The Northern School and the Formation of Early Ch'an Buddhism, University of Hawaii Press, 
 Pajin, Dusan (1988). On Faith in Mind, Journal of Oriental Studies, Vol. XXVI, No. 2, Hong Kong 1988, pp. 270–288. or here
 Putkonen, Eric (2008). Hsin Hsin Ming: Verses on the Perfect Mind. (interpretation, not a direct translation) Available as a free E-book in PDF format
 Soeng, Mu (2004). Trust in Mind: The Rebellion of Chinese Zen. Boston: Wisdom Publications. .
 Suzuki, D.T. (1960). Manual of Zen Buddhism. NY: Grove Press. .
 Cleary, J. C.; Yoshida, Osamu, trans. (1995). Three Chan Classics (The Faith-Mind Maxim; T 48, no 2010), Berkeley: BDK America.

Notes

External links
The Advaita Show, an audio reading of the Xin Xin Ming
Music File of Song of the Truthful Mind in MP3 format as well as lyrics are now available for download. Visit:  https://www.buddhistdoor.net/features/xin-xin-ming-song-of-the-truthful-mind
Trust in Mind in "A Collection of Selected Buddhist Texts" by Chung Tai Translation Committee, pages 80-87.
One Essence: The Nondual Clarity of an Ancient Zen Poem. A modern commentary on the Hsin Hsin Ming.
Collection of English translations of the Xinxin Ming
Daily Hsin Hsin Ming Verse - Android app on Google Play

Zen texts
Chinese poems
7th-century works
Buddhist commentaries
Buddhist poetry
Chinese Buddhist texts